HMS Swallow was a brig-sloop of the Royal Navy, built by Richard Symons, Little Falmouth as the packet ship Marquis of Salisbury for Captain Sutton, launched in 1819 and acquired by the Royal Navy in July 1824.

From 24 October 1821 her master was Lieutenant Thomas Baldock, RN. Lieutenant Smyth Griffith, RN, assumed command on 25 November 1831.

On 16 October 1834, HMS Swallow capsized in the Gulf of Mexico. Her masts were cut off and her guns were thrown overboard before she was righted. She put into Havana, Cuba for repairs.

The Royal Navy sold her in 1836 to the South Australian Company, who renamed her South Australian. Chartered to carry free colonists and cargo to South Australia, she sailed from Portsmouth under the command of Captain Alexander Allen, arriving in South Australia on 22 April 1837.

Fate
South Australian was wrecked in Rosetta Harbor, Encounter Bay on 8 December 1837, after she broke her anchor during a storm.

The wreck site was located in April 2018 by a team including  personnel from the following organizations – the Department for Environment and Water, the Silentworld Foundation, the South Australian Maritime Museum, the Australian National Maritime Museum, Flinders University Maritime Archaeology Program and the MaP Fund.

See also
List of shipwrecks of Australia

Citations and references
Citations

References
 

 

1819 ships
Ships built in England
Victorian-era sloops of the United Kingdom
Shipwrecks of South Australia
Maritime incidents in October 1834
Encounter Bay